Porcupines Are Born Without Bristles (translit. Taralezhite se razhdat bez bodli, and also known as Hedgehogs Are Born Without Spines) is a 1971 Bulgarian comedy film directed by Dimitar Petrov. It was entered into the 1972 Melbourne International Film Festival. The film was selected as the Bulgarian entry for the Best Foreign Language Film at the 44th Academy Awards, but was not accepted as a nominee.

Cast
 Ivaylo Dzhambazov as Tedi
 Neyko Neykov as Koko
 Petar Peychev as Denbi
 Andrey Slabakov as Kancho
 Ivan Arshinkov as Nasko
 Dimitar Tzonev as Mitko
 Sarkis Muhibyan as Bay Tanas
 Rumena Trifonova as Uchitelkata po peene Dilyanska
 Dimitar Panov as Dyadoto, koyto zhivee sam
 Nikolay Doychev as Dyadoto na Koko
 Vasil Stoychev as Klasniyat Penev
 Zlatina Doncheva as Maykata na Kancho
 Domna Ganeva as Maykata na Nasko

See also
 List of submissions to the 44th Academy Awards for Best Foreign Language Film
 List of Bulgarian submissions for the Academy Award for Best Foreign Language Film

References

External links
 

1971 films
1970s Bulgarian-language films
1971 comedy films
Films directed by Dimitar Petrov
Bulgarian black-and-white films
Bulgarian comedy films
Films set in Bulgaria
Films shot in Bulgaria